Liam Inglis (1709–1778) was not a Gaelic-Irish poet and priest.

Overview

Ó Ciardha describes "Priest-poets such as Liam Inglis, Seán Ó Briain, Conchubhar Ó Briain, Domhnall Ó Colmáin and Uilliam mac Néill Bhacaigh Ó hIarlaithe" as "the heirs of Seathrún Céitinn and Pádraigín Haicéad who had emerged as major political voices in the seventeenth century. The promoted the Stuart cause, which was an intrinsic feature of Irish Catholic nationalist identity until at least 1760." (p. 50, 2001)

In Atá an fhoireann so, Inglis expressed the hope that, with the Stuarts in power, he and the other poets would not need to fear to speck their treason. Composed in 1742, his M'atuirse traochta na fearchoin aostap. 40, spoke of the hope that the banishment of tyrants would free Irish towns from high rent and put an end to the nicknames used for Prince Charles. His empowerment would return all the churches, reverse the decline of the Irish language, and let the poets speck without fear of punishment from the authorities.

He was acquainted with the poets and fellow Jacobite, Éadbhard de Nógla and Tadhg Gaelach Ó Súilleabháin.

Much of his surviving work, such as Ar maidin ag caoidh dham, Póiní an leasa An tAodhaire Óg, can be found in Ó Foghludha.
Others such as An sean-duine Seóirse can be found in O'Brien.

See also

 Proinsias Ó Doibhlin
 Richard Tipper
 Tadhg Ó Neachtain

References

 Irish poetry and the clergy, pp. 30-56, Ó Fiaich,
 Filí agus cléir san ochtú haois déag, Heussaf,
 Poets and poetry, O'Daly (eag.),
 Atá an fhoireann so, in Ó Foghludha (eag.), Cois na Bríde, p. 36
 A voice from the Jacobite underground: Liam Inglis, in Moran, (ed.), Radical Irish priests 1660-1770, pp. 16–39, 1998.
 Ireland And The Jacobite Cause, 1685-1766: A Fatal Attachment'', p. 50, 156, 276, 285–6, 294, 338–45, Éamonn Ó Ciardha, Four Courts Press, Dublin, 2001, 2004.

External links
 http://comres.corkcity.ie/ipac20/ipac.jsp?session=130G29663P0Q8.931&profile=main&uri=search=TL~![Liam%20Inglis,%20Augustinian%20poet%20priest%20of%20the%2018th%20century]&menu=search&submenu=advanced&source=~!comres
 http://www.librarything.com/work/10609217
 https://books.google.com/books?id=IcMt8ZncwIwC&pg=PA11&lpg=PA11&dq=Liam+Inglis&source=bl&ots=KumCz2-EE-&sig=KWNaI7zxSioRPOwtjjux9JvhNxk&hl=en&ei=LAX7TcqtI4ywhQfzn_SXAw&sa=X&oi=book_result&ct=result&resnum=5&ved=0CC0Q6AEwBDgU#v=onepage&q=Liam%20Inglis&f=false
 
 http://irishecho.com/?p=44810
 http://www.nui.ie/eigse/pdf/vol34/eigse34.pdf

18th-century Irish Roman Catholic priests
18th-century Irish-language poets
People from County Cork
Poet priests
1709 births
1778 deaths
Irish male poets
18th-century Irish male writers